Lublin District League was a regional association football championship in Lublin Voivodeship, Poland (then Second Polish Republic) in 1922–1939.

The league was created in 1922. Following 1927, the Wołyń District League was created and after 1928, Kielce District League was created. After 1929, the district split again and Polesie District League was formed.

The competitions were previously conducted on territory that is now part of three countries Poland, Belarus, and Ukraine.

Winners of the league qualified to regional play-offs and the winner then advanced to the newly formed National League.

League's laureates
List of the top tier's winners of the district league

Winners
 9 – Unia Lublin (including Lublinianka Lublin)
 3 – 22 PP Siedlce (including 22 PP Strzelec Siedlce)
 2 – WKS Lublin
 1 – 9 PAC Siedlce
 1 – Strzelec Siedlce
 1 – 7 PP LEG Chełm

See also
 IV liga Lublin

References

External links
 Jan Goksiński. Football in Volhynia (Futbol na Wołyniu). Sportowa Historia.pl. 2013-10-21

2
History of football in Poland
Sport in Lublin Voivodeship